Ollie's Bargain Outlet is an American chain of discount closeout retailers. It was founded in Mechanicsburg, Pennsylvania in 1982 by Morton Bernstein and Mark L. Butler with backing from Harry Coverman and Oliver E. "Ollie" Rosenberg; the latter of whom is the namesake of the company. , the chain has 468 locations in 29 states.  Its selection of merchandise comprises a variety of discounted household goods, apparel, pet supplies, kitchen pantry staples, and seasonal products (holiday, gardening, patio, pool and beach supplies); a majority of these items are unsold or overstocked merchandise that is purchased in bulk from other retailers and sold at discounted prices.

Ollie's stores feature its namesake co-founder Ollie Rosenberg, in the form of humorous caricatures throughout its stores' interiors, merchandising displays and on its logo and exterior signage. Rosenberg, a capital area realtor and entrepreneur, died in 1996 at age 75.

History

The first store was opened in Mechanicsburg, Pennsylvania, just outside Harrisburg.

In 2008, the chain consolidated its four distribution warehouses into one located in York, Pennsylvania. In 2014, the chain opened its second distribution center in Commerce, Georgia.

In December 2019, Ollie's announced that John Swygert would become president and CEO of the company following the death of co-founder, president and CEO Mark Butler on December 1, 2019. Swygert had previously been executive vice president and chief operating officer of Ollie's since January 2018.

Operations and business model
The Ollie’s Bargain Outlet business model involves purchasing merchandise directly from manufacturers and other retailers such as Walmart/Sam’s Club, Target, Kroger, Costco, Winn-Dixie, Publix, Whole Foods Market, and TJX-owned stores in bulk and selling in smaller quantities to customers with the minimum operational and distribution costs; resulting in deeply discounted products to be sold in Ollie’s stores. The merchandise selection consists of a variety of manufacturer's overruns, overstocks and packaging changes, as well as selected other products. The company is especially focused on buying and selling closeouts.

Ollie’s Cares Charitable Foundation
The Ollie’s Cares Charitable Foundation has been supporting a number of philanthropic causes, including the following national organizations regularly and in significant ways through store events and other means: Cal Ripken, Sr. Foundation, Kevin Harvick Foundation, Feeding America, Toys for Tots, and Children's Miracle Network. Ollie’s Bargain Outlet raises more than $2 million a year for these organizations combined.

Initial public offering
An IPO was launched on July 16, 2015, at $16.00/share.

References

External links

Retail companies established in 1982
Discount stores of the United States
Companies based in Harrisburg, Pennsylvania
Companies listed on the Nasdaq
1982 establishments in Pennsylvania
2015 initial public offerings
Surplus stores
Variety stores
Toy retailers of the United States
American companies established in 1982